Count István Bittó de Sárosfa et Nádasd (3 May 1822 in Sárosfa, Kingdom of Hungary (today Blatná na Ostrove, Slovakia) – 7 March 1903 in Budapest) was a Hungarian politician who served as Speaker of the House of Representatives of Hungary from 10 September 1872 to 23 March 1874 and as Prime Minister of Hungary from 1874 to 1875.

Career
Bittó studied law and entered into a legal civil service. During the Revolution of 1848–49, he was a revolutionary and a member of the Diet of Hungary. He emigrated after the defeat of Hungary in 1849 out of the country, but returned in 1851. From 1861 Bittó was a parliamentarian in the newly convened parliament to the Liberal Party of Ferenc Deák.

After the compromise with Austria Bittó was the Deputy Speaker of the House of Representatives between 1869 and 1872. He served as justice minister in the government of Menyhért Lónyay from 1871 to 1872. On 1 March 1874 he was appointed by King Ferenc József prime minister. The office he held only until 2 March 1875 when he was replaced by Béla Wenckheim. In the era of Kálmán Tisza (1875–1890) he was one of the few former liberal oppositionists (he was the only Prime Minister who later joined to the opposition). From 1899 until his death, Bittó was a member of the House of Magnates.

References

 Rövid életrajza A Pallas nagy lexikonában
Életrajza a Magyar Országgyűlési Almanach 1901-1906-ban
[ Rövid életrajza] a Magyar életrajzi lexikonban
Életrajza a Parlament honlapján

1822 births
1903 deaths
People from Dunajská Streda District
Hungarian nobility
Prime Ministers of Hungary
Justice ministers of Hungary
Speakers of the House of Representatives of Hungary
19th-century Hungarian politicians